The discography of American rapper and songwriter Dizzy Wright consists of six studio albums, one collaboration album, 10 mixtapes, six extended plays and 99 singles (including 52 singles as a featured artist).

Albums

Studio albums

Collaborative albums

Mixtapes

Extended plays

Singles

As lead artist

As featured artist

Guest appearances

References 

Hip hop discographies
Discographies of American artists